Epilacydes unilinea is a species of moth of the family Erebidae. It was described by Rothschild in 1910. It is found in Nigeria, Senegal, Sierra Leone and Gambia.

References

 Natural History Museum Lepidoptera generic names catalog

Spilosomina
Moths described in 1910
Fauna of the Gambia
Moths of Africa